is a Japanese sports drink, manufactured by Otsuka Pharmaceutical. It was launched in 1980, and is mostly well known across Asia and the Middle East; it is also available in East Asia, Southeast Asia, Australia and Mexico.

Pocari Sweat is a mild-tasting, relatively light, non-carbonated sweet beverage and is advertised as an "ion supply drink", "refreshment water" (1992), "body request" (1999), and "electrolyte beverage" in Thailand. It has a mild grapefruit flavor with little aftertaste. Ingredients listed are water, sugar, citric acid, trisodium citrate, sodium chloride, potassium chloride, calcium lactate, magnesium carbonate, and flavoring. It is sold in aluminium cans, PET bottles, and as a powder for mixing with water. An artificially sweetened version with reduced sugar called  is also sold.

History 
Pocari Sweat was launched in 1980 in Japan by Rokuro Harima, an Otsuka Pharmaceutical employee who came up with the idea after observing a doctor drink IV solution to rehydrate. Harima had taken a trip to the hospital after getting diarrhea during a business trip to Mexico, and wondered if a drink could provide both the water and nutrients he needed to recover.

Wary of Gatorade's dominance of the United States market, Pocari Sweat focused on expansion into Asia and the Middle East. In 1982, it was exported overseas for the first time, to Hong Kong and Taiwan, followed the next year by Singapore, Bahrain, Oman and Saudi Arabia. By the mid-1990s, Pocari Sweat had become Japan's first domestically produced non-alcoholic drink to ship over $1 billion in product.

Name 
The reference to sweat in the name of the beverage might have a somewhat off-putting or mildly humorous connotation for some English speakers. However, the name was chosen by the manufacturers originally for the purpose of marketing the product as a sports drink in Japan, where English words are used differently. It was largely derived from the notion of what it is intended to supply to the drinker: all of the nutrients and electrolytes lost when sweating. The first part of the name, Pocari, gives a refreshing impression. Otsuka Pharmaceutical's website states: Pocari' was named for its light nuance and bright sound, and it has no particular meaning."

Marketing 
Pocari Sweat has maintained the same blue-and-white color scheme since its inception in 1980. Originally sold in a 245 mL can, it has been sold primarily in bottle form since 1990.

Otsuka began a targeted marketing campaign in Indonesia after an outbreak of dengue fever in 2010, promoting the drink to prevent dehydration, a common symptom of the disease.

On 15 May 2014, Pocari Sweat started a project to send a "dream capsule" to the Moon. The capsule will have the same shape as a Pocari Sweat can and will be filled with Pocari Sweat powder. Once it arrives, Pocari Sweat will be the first commercial product advertised on the Moon. Originally scheduled to launch on a SpaceX Falcon 9 rocket in October 2015, it is currently booked on an Astrobotic Technology lander that will launch in 2023.

The company also has done extensive advertising through anime. The technical director for the film Your Name helped create a 2019 anime-styled advertisement. Pocari Sweat released a January 2021 special episode of the Cells at Work! anime promoting the drink as a way to prevent heat stroke.

See also 
 Aquarius (a similar beverage manufactured by The Coca-Cola Company)
 Calpis
 Oronamin C Drink
 Lipovitan
 Foreign branding
 100plus
 Super Supau

References

External links 

 Official website
 Pocari Sweat in Otsuka's website (Japanese and English)
 History of the development of Pocari Sweat (English)

Sports drinks
Japanese drinks
Japanese brands
Products introduced in 1980
Otsuka Pharmaceutical